Lopidea instabilis is a species of plant bug in the family Miridae. It is found in North America.

References

Further reading

 
 

Articles created by Qbugbot
Insects described in 1909
Orthotylini